Aaron Molloy (born 11 January 1997) is an Irish professional footballer who plays as a midfielder for USL Championship club Memphis 901.

Youth and college
Molloy played for the Bohemians academy for the 2014–15 season, as well as a short season in 2015 where he served as captain. He received the Bohemians U19 player of the year award for the 2014–15 season.

College
After a season with Drogheda United in Ireland, Molloy decided to move to the United States to play college soccer. He played in 15 matches as a freshman at Keiser University, recording his first appearance against Texas Wesleyan on 9 September 2016 and scoring his first goal at St. Thomas on 19 October.

In his first season at Penn State, Molloy appeared in 16 matches. He made his Nittany Lions debut against Hofstra on 25 August 2017 and scored his first goal at UC Irvine on 1 September. In his junior season, Molloy was a team captain and appeared in 15 matches. He earned Big Ten preseason honors, All-Big Ten second team and United Soccer Coaches All-North Region third-team. In his senior season, Molloy was again a team captain and appeared in 19 matches.

Club career
The first senior appearance for Molloy was for Irish club Droghead United, where in 2016 he played in 13 matches and scored two goals. After the season, Molloy paused his professional career and went to the United States to play college soccer for Keiser University and Penn State University. Molloy began playing with the Philadelphia Union’s Premier Development League affiliate Reading United AC in 2016, appearing with the club for three seasons. He was named the PDL Young Player of the Year in 2017.

Molloy was invited to the 2020 MLS Combine, and was subsequently drafted by Portland Timbers with the 16th pick of the 2020 MLS SuperDraft. Molloy signed with Portland Timbers 2 in the USL Championship, the club that serves as a reserve squad for the Portland Timbers. Molloy made his Timbers debut on 18 July 2020, starting in a 3–0 loss to Tacoma Defiance.

On February 17, 2021, Molloy signed with USL League One club Forward Madison FC.

On January 11, 2022, Molloy moved to USL Championship side Memphis 901.

Career statistics

Personal life
Molloy is the son of Trevor Molloy, a fellow Irish footballer who played for teams in Ireland. Molloy studied for a Bachelor of Science degree in recreation, park, and tourism management from the College of Health and Human Development at Penn State.

Awards
 PDL Young Player of the Year
 Big Ten Midfielder of the Year
 All-Big Ten first team 
 All-Big Ten second team 
 TopDrawerSoccer 2019 Best XI First Team
 United Soccer Coaches All-North Region First Team
 United Soccer Coaches All-America Second Team.
 United Soccer Coaches All-North Region third-team member 
 Sun Conference Freshman of the Year
 All-Sun Conference second team
USL Championship All League First Team: 2022

References

External links
 Portland profile

1997 births
Living people
Republic of Ireland association footballers
Association footballers from Dublin (city)
Association football midfielders
Bohemian F.C. players
Drogheda United F.C. players
Memphis 901 FC players
Penn State Nittany Lions men's soccer players
Reading United A.C. players
Portland Timbers draft picks
Portland Timbers 2 players
Forward Madison FC players
League of Ireland players
USL Championship players
USL League One players
USL League Two players
Republic of Ireland expatriate association footballers
Expatriate soccer players in the United States
Irish expatriate sportspeople in the United States